The North Fork Kings River is a  tributary of the Kings River, in the U.S. state of California.

Course
It flows west through a high, lake-studded alpine basin before dropping into a deep valley. The river receives Post Corral and Helms creeks from the right before emptying into Wishon Reservoir, formed by the Wishon Dam. Flowing southwards into a gorge, the river then receives Rancheria Creek from the left, then turns southwest into Black Rock Reservoir. After this reservoir, it flows west and receives Patterson Creek from the right, and is impounded again at a small diversion dam. Shortly afterwards it receives Dinkey Creek, its largest tributary, from the right at Balch Camp, then turns south, flowing into the Kings River just northwest of Rodgers Crossing.

River modifications
An extensive hydroelectric system is located along the North Fork. Below the Wishon Dam the North Fork flows through a gorge with a massive drop in elevation and is used to generate conventional hydroelectricity at two stations along its course. A  tunnel from Wishon Reservoir carries water to the 128 megawatt underground Haas Powerhouse, where the water drops  to power the turbines. Below that is the Kings River Powerhouse, which discharges water directly into Pine Flat Lake.

The Balch Powerhouse is one of the oldest hydro developments on the Kings River, originally completed in 1927 by San Joaquin Light & Power, a predecessor of Pacific Gas and Electric Company (PG&E). It was only after the Balch Powerhouse was incorporated into PG&E's system that plans were finalized for the Haas Powerhouse, which was completed in 1959. Construction on the big storage dams at Wishon and Courtright Reservoir were completed in 1962. The North Fork system was at one point, in the 1940s, the subject of a local controversy regarding whether it should be developed by the federal government or a private company (PG&E). Farmers feared that the federal plan would involve moving water south as part of the Central Valley Project, reducing what was available for local use. On the other hand, PG&E was willing to negotiate with the farmers for the use of reservoir water, and more importantly, its project would involve no transbasin diversions, keeping all the water in the Kings River system. The debate was settled in 1949 when PG&E was allowed to construct the Wishon and Courtright dams.

Wishon Reservoir and Courtright Reservoir, respectively, are the lower and upper reservoirs for the Helms Pumped Storage Plant, which at 1,212 megawatts is one of the largest pumped-storage hydroelectricity plants in the United States. Water is pumped into Courtright Reservoir during times of low demand and released into Wishon Reservoir to generate peaking power. Also owned by PG&E, the plant was built between 1977 and 1984.

See also
List of rivers of California
Tulare Lake
Middle Fork Kings River
South Fork Kings River

References

Kings River North
Kings River North
Kings River North
Kings River North
Rivers of the Sierra Nevada in California
Hydroelectric power plants in California